Selinia is a genus of fungi in the class Sordariomycetes. It consists of two species.

References

Hypocreales genera
Bionectriaceae
Taxa named by Petter Adolf Karsten
Taxa described in 1876